Atmosphere is a rock band established in 1993 in Leszno, Poland. Marcin Rozynek was a member of Atmosphere until 2000.

Discography
Atmosphere (1997)
Europa Naftowa (1999)

Members
Waldemar Dąże - g
Dariusz Matuszewski - dr
Marcin Rozynek - voc, g
Łukasz Wachowiak - bg
Aleksander Wnukowski - kbds

References

External links
 Atmosphere on rateyourmusic.com

Polish rock music groups
Musical groups established in 1993
1993 establishments in Poland